Anne Marie Pace is an American author, known for her Vampirina Ballerina books. She attended the College of William & Mary, where she graduated in 1987 with a bachelor's degree in English. Prior to becoming a full-time writer, Pace wrote for children's magazines.

Bibliography
Never Ever Talk to Strangers (2010, Scholastic, illustrated by Guy Francis)
A Teacher for Bear (2011, Scholastic, illustrated by Mike Wohnoutka)
Pigloo (2016, Henry Holt, illustrated by Lorna Hussey)
Groundhug Day (2017, Disney-Hyperion, illustrated by Christopher Denise)
Busy-Eyed Day (2018, Beach Lane Books/Simon & Schuster, illustrated by Frann Preston-Gannon)
Sunny's Tow Truck Saves the Day (2019, Abrams Appleseed, illustrated by Christopher Lee)
Mouse Calls (2022, Beach Lane Books/Simon & Schuster, illustrated by Erin Kraan)

Vampirina Ballerina
Vampirina Ballerina (2012, illustrated by LeUyen Pham)
Vampirina Ballerina Hosts a Sleepover (2013, illustrated by LeUyen Pham)
Vampirina at the Beach (2017, illustrated by LeUyen Pham)
Vampirina in the Snow (2018, illustrated by LeUyen Pham)

In March 2016, the cable channel Disney Junior announced the development of Vampirina, an animated television series based on the Vampirina Ballerina books, which premiered in October 2017.

References

External links
 

Writers from Virginia
American children's writers
College of William & Mary alumni
Living people
Year of birth missing (living people)
American women children's writers
21st-century American writers
21st-century American women writers